Pantović is a Serbian surname. Notable people with the surname include:

Miloš Pantović (born 1996), Serbian footballer
Ognjen Pantović (born 1989), Serbian politician
Zvonko Pantović (born 1966), Serbian singer

Serbian surnames